Henry George Chancellor (3 June 1863 – 14 March 1945), was a radical British Liberal Party politician.

Background
Chancellor was the son of John Chancellor of Walton and Louisa Porter of Ashcott. He was educated at Elmfield College, York. In 1885 he married Mary Dyer Surl of Newent, Gloucester. They had one son and three daughters.

Professional career
He ran the newspaper, 'The Londoner' from 1896–99. The paper was progressive in its outlook.

Political career
Around 1885 Chancellor became involved in politics. He was active for both the Liberal Party and at municipal level for their sister party, the Progressive Party. He was also in active in the Peace and Temperance movements. In 1895 he became President of the North Islington Liberal Association. He was a Progressive Party candidate for the North division of Islington at the 1907 London County Council Election.

Chancellor was elected in January 1910 as the Liberal MP for the Haggerston Division of Shoreditch. He gained the seat from the sitting Conservative MP, despite the presence of a socialist candidate.

He was actively involved in the English League for the Taxation of Land Values, serving as President in 1910 and 1920.

By 1918 he was clearly identified with a group of Liberals who wished to see the party co-operate closely with the Labour Party and was one of the founders of a "Radical Committee".

He held Haggerston until the constituency was merged in 1918 into the new Division of Shoreditch. At the subsequent general election he stood as the (Asquith) Liberal candidate in competition with the Liberal Christopher Addison who had represented the Hoxton part of the new constituency. Addison, who was a supporter of Lloyd George, received the 'coupon' defeated Chancellor. He did not stand for parliament again.

In 1938 he was Honorary Secretary of the pacifist International Arbitration League.

Electoral record

References

External links 
 

1863 births
1945 deaths
Liberal Party (UK) MPs for English constituencies
UK MPs 1910
UK MPs 1910–1918